This is a list of Catholic creationist organisations.

Cercle d'Étude Scientifique et Historique
Cercle d'Étude Scientifique et Historique (CESHE), was founded in 1971 in Belgium to preserve and disseminate the work of French scholar Fernand Crombette, whose works include 38 volumes and two atlases that deal with geography, the Flood, astronomy and the pre-history of Mediterranean peoples.  In 2008, an English-language affiliate was established in North America.

Daylight Origins Society
The Daylight Origins Society is a recent Earth creationist organisation based in the United Kingdom with ties to both the Traditionalist Catholic movement and conservative vernacular Catholics. The stated aims of the Society are "to inform Catholics and others of the scientific evidence supporting special creation as opposed to evolution, and that the true discoveries of Science are in conformity with Catholic doctrines." According to the British Centre for Science Education, which maintains a list of anti-evolution groups, the Daylight Origins Society, "doesn't appear to cooperate at all with mainstream creationist groups which are all basically Protestant, calvinistic and evangelical," and that "as far as [they] can make out, it is not very active."
The Daylight Origins Society was founded in 1977 by John G. Campbell as the Counter Evolution Group. His origins science magazine was relaunched in 1991 under its present name, as a branch of CESHE. The current secretary of the Society is Anthony Nevard, a retired school teacher living in Hertfordshire. Polish academic and Member of the European Parliament Maciej Giertych is an honorary member of the Society. 
The Society have a website and issues a quarterly Catholic creationist journal titled Daylight, published beginning in 1977 by Campbell, and after 1991, published and edited by Nevard. Its writers have included Giertych and it has reprinted works by historical Christian authors, including G. K. Chesterton and C. S. Lewis. In 2010 they launched a techni-colour cover edition of Daylight, and the magazine is still in print today (2015).

The Kolbe Center for the study of Creation
The Kolbe Center is a Catholic organisation based in Mount Jackson, Virginia, in the United States. The Kolbe Center was founded on December 8, 2000.

Other organisations
Institute for Science and Catholicism (United States) was founded in 2015. It publishes the book Creation, Evolution, and Catholicism: A Discussion for Those Who Believe in print and ebook format to promote the renewal of a Catholic theology of creation and a new science/faith synthesis based on sound scientific data and a serious approach to the Holy Scriptures in accordance with longstanding Church Tradition. 
Morning Star (United States) was founded in 1994. It  publishes a journal called The Watchmaker.
Centre d’Etudes et de Prospective sur la Science/Center for Studies and Prospective on Science (France)
The International Institute for Culture (United States), whose aim is Catholic cultural renewal, presented a lecture series on "Evolution: The Untold Story" with the theme "Latest Scientific Discoveries Challenge Darwinian Evolution’s Fitness to Survive" in October 2009. It featured intelligent design proponents Michael Behe and John C. Sanford, National Catholic Bioethics Center president John Haas, and Kolbe Center director Hugh Owen.
The schismatic and sedevacantist Most Holy Family Monastery promotes creationism as part of its ministry.

See also
Relationship between religion and science
Catholic Church and evolution
Creation–evolution controversy
Creation science 
Young Earth creationism
Flood geology

References

External links
 CESHE
 CESHE-USA
 The Kolbe Center
 Daylight Origins Society
 In Six Days
International Institute for Culture

Creationist organizations
Cath